Chederick van Wyk (born 18 February 1995) is a South African sprinter.

Career 
Coloured, he won the silver medal during 2019 IAAF World Relays, with the African record in the 4 × 200 metres relay.

During the 2019 Universiade in Naples, he won two more silver medals, 100 m and 200 m, just behind Paulo André de Oliveira.

International competitions

Personal bests

References

External links
 

1995 births
Living people
Universiade medalists in athletics (track and field)
Universiade silver medalists for South Africa
Athletes (track and field) at the 2019 African Games
South African male sprinters
Medalists at the 2019 Summer Universiade
African Games competitors for South Africa
Athletes (track and field) at the 2020 Summer Olympics
African Games medalists in athletics (track and field)
African Games bronze medalists for South Africa
Olympic athletes of South Africa